The UAE Football League (UFL) Rookie of the Year is awarded by the Sheikh Majid Bin Mohammed Football Season Award to the most outstanding rookie of the season.  To be considered a rookie the following are criteria for the award: his behaviors, his participation with the national team and Club, the impact of the player on the results of his team, and the extent of his contribution to the achievement of team championship

Best Rookie of the Year

Wins By Club

References

Rookie
Emirati awards
Rookie player awards
Awards established in 2008